Tsimintiri, also known as Koimitiri, is a small, uninhabited islet in the Cyclades islands of the southern Aegean. Tsimintiri is located between the islands of Antiparos and Despotiko.

Archaeologists have discovered grave sites on the island, which may be the reason for its alternate name, Koimitiri, meaning "resting place."

References

Cyclades
Uninhabited islands of Greece
Landforms of Paros (regional unit)